Casa Amor: Exclusive for Ladies (lit. Working Girl) is a 2015 South Korean sex comedy film directed by Jung Bum-shik, starring Jo Yeo-jeong and Clara. It is adapted from the 2010 Brazilian film Upside Down.

Plot
Beautiful, workaholic Bo-hee is a successful marketing executive at the number one toy company in Korea. Respected by her colleagues and in line for a promotion, she makes an irrevocable mistake that gets her fired from her job. Bo-hee's life further spins out of control when her husband Gang-sung leaves her soon after.

Bo-hee is befriended by her neighbor Nan-hee, an amateur sex expert who runs a sex shop on the brink of bankruptcy called "Casa Amor." Nan-hee's predicament inspires Bo-hee's creativity, and using her background in children's toys, she is determined to save the shop by making its ambiance more refined and by promoting better sex toys.

Cast
Jo Yeo-jeong as Baek Bo-hee
Clara as Oh Nan-hee
Kim Tae-woo as Koo Gang-sung
Kim Bo-yeon as Yoon Gwan-soon
Ra Mi-ran as Eum Soon-ok
Bae Sung-woo as Seok Soo-beom
Kim Gi-cheon as Company president Cheon
Kim Ha-yoo as Koo Ha-yoo
Kim Young-ok as Chairman Yeon
Oh Na-ra as Soo-beom's wife
Lee Seon-hee as Housewife
Go Kyung-pyo as Pyo Kyeong-soo (cameo)
Jo Jae-yoon as Jo Ji-ho (cameo)
Choi Seong-joon as Nan-hee's first love (cameo)
Lee Jae-gu as Nan-hee's father (cameo)
Julien Kang as Muscle man (cameo)
Megu Fujiura as Reiko

References

External links
 

2015 films
South Korean sex comedy films
2010s sex comedy films
South Korean remakes of Brazilian films
2015 comedy films
2010s South Korean films